Blake Govers (born 6 July 1996) is an Australian field hockey player who plays as a forward for the NSW Pride in the  Hockey One League and the Australian national team.

He is the younger brother of former international hockey player Kieran Govers. He coaches a group of young female athletes at the Southern River Hockey Club, based in the south of Perth, WA.

International career
He competed in the men's field hockey tournament at the 2016 Summer Olympics and in the 2018 Men's Hockey World Cup. At the 2018 World Cup he was the joint-topscorer with seven goals. He was the topscorer of the 2019 FIH Pro League as he scored 12 goals in 14 matches for Australia. In December 2019, he was nominated for the FIH Rising Star of the Year Award.

Govers was selected in the Kookaburras Olympics squad for the Tokyo 2020 Olympics. The team reached the final for the first time since 2004 but couldn't achieve gold, beaten by Belgium in a shootout.

Club career
During the 2014–15 season, Govers played for Wimbledon in England, where he scored five goals in the championship final. He also played in the Netherlands for Bloemendaal in the 2016–17 season.

References

External links
 
 
 
 

1996 births
Living people
Australian male field hockey players
Male field hockey forwards
Olympic field hockey players of Australia
Field hockey players at the 2016 Summer Olympics
2018 Men's Hockey World Cup players
Men's England Hockey League players
Wimbledon Hockey Club players
HC Bloemendaal players
Men's Hoofdklasse Hockey players
Field hockey players at the 2020 Summer Olympics
Sportspeople from Wollongong
Olympic silver medalists for Australia
Medalists at the 2020 Summer Olympics
Olympic medalists in field hockey
Field hockey players at the 2022 Commonwealth Games
Commonwealth Games gold medallists for Australia
Commonwealth Games medallists in field hockey
Sportsmen from New South Wales
Australian expatriate sportspeople in the Netherlands
Australian expatriate sportspeople in England
Expatriate field hockey players
2023 Men's FIH Hockey World Cup players
Medallists at the 2022 Commonwealth Games